Clostridium bornimense  is an anaerobic, mesophilic and hydrogen-producing bacterium from the genus Clostridium which has been isolated from a biogas reactor in Germany.

References

 

Bacteria described in 2014
bornimense